Anthony De Sa is a Canadian novelist and short story writer. He graduated from University of Toronto and did his post-graduate work at Queen's University. In 2004, De Sa took a one-year sabbatical and attended the Humber School for Writers. He subsequently submitted Barnacle Love, a volume of linked stories about a Portuguese immigrant family, to publishers, and Random House of Canada published the collection in March 2008. Barnacle Love was a shortlisted finalist for the 2008 Scotiabank Giller Prize. and the 2009 Toronto Book Awards.

De Sa expanded on the story "Shoeshine Boy" from Barnacle Love, set against the 1977 murder of Emanuel Jaques, into a novel. Titled Kicking the Sky, it was published by Doubleday Canada on September 10, 2013.

References

External links
 Anthony De Sa

21st-century Canadian novelists
Canadian male short story writers
Canadian educators
Writers from Toronto
Canadian people of Portuguese descent
Living people
University of Toronto alumni
Queen's University at Kingston alumni
Humber College alumni
Canadian male novelists
21st-century Canadian short story writers
1965 births
21st-century Canadian male writers